A list of films produced by the Israeli film industry in 1962.

1962 releases

See also
1962 in Israel

References

External links
 Israeli films of 1962 at the Internet Movie Database

Israeli
Film
1962